Wei Shyy  is an aerospace engineer who served as the 4th President of the Hong Kong University of Science and Technology (HKUST) from 2018 to 2022 with his acting presidency starting from 1 February 2018. He also holds a concurrent appointment as Chair Professor of Mechanical & Aerospace Engineering. He first joined HKUST in August 2010 as Provost.

Education and early life
Born and raised in Taiwan, Shyy received his Bachelor of Science from National Tsing Hua University in Taiwan in 1977 and then went to the United States in 1979 to study at the University of Michigan where he received a Master of Science degree in aerospace engineering in 1981. He later received his PhD from the University of Michigan in 1982. He was subsequently employed by the University of Florida and GE Research and Development Center in Schenectady, New York.

Academic career
Shyy was Clarence L. "Kelly" Johnson Collegiate Professor and Chairman of the Department of Aerospace Engineering of the University of Michigan. In August 2010 he joined The Hong Kong University of Science and Technology (HKUST) as Provost. In 2013 he additionally became Executive Vice-President at HKUST. He was appointed the fourth President of HKUST in September 2018, succeeding Tony F. Chan.

In November 2021, Shyy announced that he would depart from his position with effect from October 2022, almost a year before the end of his five-year term. Shyy gave no reason for his early departure.

On 8 November 2019, during the 2019–2020 Hong Kong protests, Shyy was presiding over a graduation ceremony when he was notified of the death of Chow Tsz-lok, a HKUST student. He paused the ceremony for a period of silent mourning. Later he called for an independent enquiry into the death. Shyy was one of three university heads in Hong Kong who did not express support for the imposition of the national security law, telling reporters that as it had already become law, he had "no need" to support it.

Research
Shyy has made substantial contributions to air and space flight vehicle research and development, fluid machinery design optimization, and computational methods for complex unsteady flows. His work in flapping wing aerodynamics, surrogate-based optimization for space propulsion components and battery technologies, computational modeling for gas turbine combustor flows, cavitating and multiphase dynamics, power generation devices, biomechanical systems, and high performance materials processing are internationally recognized.

He and his collaborators were the first to: 
 Identify the main sources of hydrocarbon emissions from spark-ignition internal combustion engines;
 Compute gas-turbine combustor flows for GE using 3-D Navier-Stokes equations on body-fitted meshes;
 Recognize and propose to adopt structural flexibility for micro air vehicles; and
 Offer an analytical framework to model the characteristics of glow discharge type of plasma actuator.
In addition, research by him and his collaborators has offered

 original insight into low Reynolds number aerodynamics for small scale flight vehicles and Mars helicopter blades (due to Mars’ low density atmosphere)
 comprehensive framework and tools for surrogate model-based data analytics and optimization techniques using artificial neural network, statistical techniques and diver sources of data input

Professional services
His professional views have been quoted in various news media, including the New York Times, the Washington Post, the Associated Press, the USA Today, the Christian Science Monitor, the New Scientist and the U.S. News & World Report. He also contributed multiple articles to the World Economic Forum.

He is the author or a co-author of five books and numerous journal and conference articles dealing with computational and modeling techniques involving fluid flow, biological and low Reynolds number aerodynamics, combustion and propulsion, and a broad range of topics related to aerial and space flight vehicles. He is General Editor of the Cambridge Aerospace Book Series published by the Cambridge University Press, Co-Editor-in Chief of Encyclopedia of Aerospace Engineering, a major reference work published by Wiley-Blackwell. His photos on birds and insects in motion have been collected as books, entitled Flight InSight and Flapping.

Awards and honors
 Fellow of American Institute of Aeronautics and Astronautics (AIAA) & American Society of Mechanical Engineers (ASME)
 AIAA 2003 Pendray Aerospace Literature Award
 ASME 2005 Heat Transfer Memorial Award
 The Engineers’ Council (Sherman Oaks, CA) 2009 Distinguished Educator Award
 Distinguished Alumnus Award, National Tsing Hua University (2013)
 University of Michigan 2013 Alumni Merit Award for the Department of Aerospace Engineering
 In 2021, the French Government made him an Officer of the Legion of Honor.

Footnotes

References

External links
Biography of Wei Shyy from HKUST website

 

Fluid dynamicists
Computational fluid dynamicists
Academic staff of the Hong Kong University of Science and Technology
University of Florida faculty
University of Michigan faculty
University of Michigan College of Engineering alumni
National Tsing Hua University alumni
Fellows of the American Society of Mechanical Engineers
Fellows of the American Institute of Aeronautics and Astronautics
Living people
Taiwanese emigrants to the United States
Taiwanese emigrants to Hong Kong
1955 births
Presidents of the Hong Kong University of Science and Technology